Hanım is a 1989 Turkish drama film directed by Halit Refiğ.

References

External links 

1988 films
1988 drama films
Turkish drama films
Films directed by Halit Refiğ
1989 drama films
1989 films